Robert Smith is a former American football coach. He served as the head football coach at Western Washington University from 1989 to 2005 and Humboldt State University in Humboldt, California from 2008 to 2017, compiling a career college football coaching record of 172–106–1.

Head coaching record

References

1957 births
Living people
Humboldt State Lumberjacks football coaches
Washington Huskies football players
Western Washington Vikings football coaches